The Valea Seacă is a left tributary of the river Topolița in Romania. It flows into the Topolița in the village Topolița.

References

Rivers of Romania
Rivers of Neamț County